State Highway 208 (SH 208) is a Texas state highway that runs from San Angelo to southeast of Spur.

History
The route was originally designated on July 16, 1934 from San Angelo to Robert Lee. On June 16, 1936, SH 208 was extended north to Colorado City. The section from Robert Lee to Colorado City was dropped on March 26, 1942, but was reinstated on April 23, 1947, when it replaced RM 18. On February 23, 1956, the route was extended farther north to Snyder, replacing part of SH 101, and was signed (but not designated) to Spur along FM 1231 and FM 948. The extension to Spur was officially designated on August 29, 1990 to Spur, cancelling FM 1231 and FM 948.

FM 1231 was designated in 1949 as a route from US 84 at Snyder north 8.8 miles to a road intersection. In 1951, FM 1231 was extended north to the Kent County Line. Later that year, FM 1231 was extended 3 miles further north. In 1952, FM 1231 was extended to US 380, replacing FM 1741 from US 380 south 6.1 miles. FM 1231 was cancelled in 1990 and transferred to SH 208.

Junction list

References

208
Transportation in Tom Green County, Texas
Transportation in Coke County, Texas
Transportation in Mitchell County, Texas
Transportation in Scurry County, Texas
Transportation in Kent County, Texas
Transportation in Dickens County, Texas
1934 establishments in Texas